The 1988 Limerick Senior Hurling Championship was the 94th staging of the Limerick Senior Hurling Championship since its establishment by the Limerick County Board.

Patrickswell were the defending champions.

On 16 October 1988, Patrickswell won the championship after a 4-10 to 2-06 defeat of Cappamore in a final replay. It was their 11th championship title overall and their second title in succession.

Results

Final

References

Limerick Senior Hurling Championship
Limerick Senior Hurling Championship